Jastew  is a village in the administrative district of Gmina Dębno, within Brzesko County, Lesser Poland Voivodeship, in southern Poland.

The village has a population of 550.

References

Jastew